Mesotype verberata is a moth in the family Geometridae first described by Giovanni Antonio Scopoli in his 1763 Entomologia Carniolica.

Description
The wingspan is 24–32 mm. Background color of the wings is whitish. Upperside of the forewings shows three to five, thin, gray-brown, wavy lines. The hindwings are whitish and show one or two indistinct transverse lines. At the base of all wings there are small black dots.

Biology
Adults are on wing mainly in June, July and August. They feed on the nectar of a number of flowers, including those of Solidago virgaurea, Aconitum napellus and Campanula rotundifolia.

The larvae feed on various plants, including Meum athamanticum and Prenanthes purpurea. They can be found from April to June. The species overwinters as an egg.

Distribution
This species can be found mainly in the mountainous regions of Central Europe, from Spain through the Alps and the Balkan Peninsula to Western Asia.

References

External links 

Lepiforum e.V.

Moths described in 1763
Perizomini
Moths of Europe
Taxa named by Giovanni Antonio Scopoli